Ingrid Mason is a Papua New Guinea born actress. Mason had a long running role on TV in The Sullivans. She was originally cast as Miranda in Picnic at Hanging Rock before being replaced by Anne-Louise Lambert and then being given a different part. She was nominated for the 1977 AFI Award for Best Actress in a Supporting Role for her role in the film Break of Day.

Filmography

FILM

TELEVISION

References

External links
 
 Biographical cuttings on Ingrid Mason, former TV personality, containing one or more cuttings from newspapers or journals at the National Library of Australia.

Living people
Papua New Guinean actors
Australian television actresses
Australian film actresses
1952 births